The northern dark newtonia (Newtonia amphichroa) is a species of bird in the family Vangidae.
It is endemic to northeastern Madagascar. Its natural habitat is subtropical or tropical moist lowland forests.

It was formerly grouped with the recently described southern dark newtonia (N. lavarambo) as the dark newtonia. However, a 2018 study described N. lavarambo as a distinct species based on genetic and physical characteristics, and thus both were split from each other. However, some authorities such as The Clements Checklist of Birds of the World have tentatively classified N. lavarambo as a subspecies of N. amphicroa rather than a distinct species.

References

dark newtonia
dark newtonia
Taxonomy articles created by Polbot